A total of 116 people have served on the Supreme Court of the United States, the highest judicial body in the United States, since it was established in 1789. Supreme Court justices have life tenure, and so they serve until they die, resign, retire, or are impeached and removed from office. For the 107 non-incumbent justices, the average length of service was 6,203 days (16 years, 359 days). The longest serving justice was William O. Douglas, with a tenure of 13,358 days. The longest serving chief justice was John Marshall, with a tenure of 12,570 days. John Rutledge, who served on the court twice, was both the shortest serving associate justice, with a tenure of 383 days, and the shortest serving chief justice, with a tenure of 138 days. Among the current members of the court, Clarence Thomas's tenure of  days is the longest, while Ketanji Brown Jackson's  days is the shortest.

The table below ranks all United States Supreme Court justices by time in office. For five individuals confirmed for associate justice, and who later served as chief justice—Charles Evans Hughes, William Rehnquist, John Rutledge, Harlan F. Stone, and Edward Douglass White—their cumulative length of service on the court is measured. The basis of the ranking is the difference between dates; if counted by number of calendar days all the figures would be one greater, with the exception of Charles Evans Hughes and John Rutledge, who would receive two days, as each served on the court twice (their service as associate justice and as chief justice was separated by a period of years off the court). The start date given for each justice is the day they took the prescribed oath of office, with the end date being the date of the justice's death, resignation, or retirement. A highlighted row indicates a justice currently serving on the court.

Justices by time in office

Notes

See also
List of justices of the Supreme Court of the United States
List of law schools attended by United States Supreme Court justices
List of justices of the Supreme Court of the United States by seat
List of United States federal judges by longevity of service

References

United States, Supreme Court, Justices
Time in office